The Olympus 35 SP is a 35 mm rangefinder camera made by Olympus in Japan. It is the only 35 mm rangefinder with a dual center-weighted average metering and spot metering system. Metering is also available in manual mode, which is quite unusual amongst Japanese rangefinder cameras of this era. The uncoupled meter gives light readings in exposure values within the viewfinder which is then translated to exposure settings around the lens of the camera. It was succeeded by smaller cameras such as the 35RC and 35RD before Olympus pivoted to SLR cameras for the prosumer/professional market.

Specification
 Lens: G. Zuiko , 42 mm, 7 elements in 4 groups
 Aperture Range:  for auto exposure,  for manual mode
 Shutter Speeds: B, 1–1/500 for manual mode
 Focus Range: .85 meters/2.8 feet – infinity
 Automatic Exposure Control: Fully automatic program exposure, EV 5.5–17 in ISO 100
 Exposure Meter: dual system, center-weighted or 6 degree spot metering, EV 3–17 in manual mode 
 Filter Size: 49 mm
 Film Speed Scale: ASA 25–800
 Size: 129 mm × 76 mm × 61 mm
 Weight: 600 grams/22 ounces
 Battery: PX625 1.35 volt mercury cell

See also
 List of Olympus products
 Olympus 35RC
 Olympus 35RD
 Olympus XA

External links
 http://www.cameraquest.com/olysp.htm
 http://www.ph.utexas.edu/~yue/misc/35SP.html
 Compact 35s — an overview of the many 35 mm rangefinders popular in the 1970s
 Olympus 35SP on arransalerno.com — a personal overview from a frequent user

35SP
Cameras introduced in 1969